Frenzied Flames is a 1926 American silent action film directed by Stuart Paton and starring Cullen Landis, Virginia Brown Faire and Mary Carr.

Cast
 Cullen Landis as Danny Grovan 
 Virginia Brown Faire as Alice Meagen 
 Mary Carr as Mrs. Grogan 
 Charles K. French as Chief Grogan 
 Barry Blake as Joe Hanlan 
 William Welsh as Captain Meagan 
 Jack Huff as Ivory

References

Bibliography
 Munden, Kenneth White. The American Film Institute Catalog of Motion Pictures Produced in the United States, Part 1. University of California Press, 1997.

External links

1926 films
1920s action films
American action films
Films directed by Stuart Paton
American silent feature films
American black-and-white films
1920s English-language films
1920s American films